São Francisco do Guaporé is a municipality located in the Brazilian state of Rondônia. Its population was 20,681 (2020) and its area is 10,960 km².

The municipality contains 9% of the  Serra dos Reis State Park.
It contains 86% of the  Serra dos Reis A State Park, created in 1996.
It holds part of the  Guaporé Biological Reserve, a strictly protected conservation unit.

References

Sao Francisco de Guapore